The COVID-19 Case-Cluster-Study – colloquially, Heinsberg study, also known as Heinsbergprotokoll and HEINSBERG PROTOKOLL. – is a study  about the COVID-19 pandemic in Gangelt.

The study was commissioned and is co-financed by the government of North Rhine-Westphalia and is led by Hendrik Streeck. In the public sphere, the marketing agency StoryMachine presented its results on Facebook and Twitter. Private enterprises also co-financed the study. The results of the study garnered cross-national media attention.

The study aimed to determine lethality of and immunity to SARS-CoV-2; it also estimated the number of unrecorded cases.

Despite the fact that sample size does not determine the representativeness of a study, principal investigator Streeck claims, they examined more persons than recommended by the World Health Organization, the study would "thus be statistically absolutely representative".

Criticism 
One weakness of the study was the calculation of the IFR, which represents the lethality of COVID-19. The number of deaths were counted only for a period of 14 days. Because deaths accumulate over many weeks rather than directly after the infection, the study captured barely half the related deaths. This alone meant that the IFR was almost twice as high as calculated. When the study was published in Nature Communications in November 2020, the authors had not revised their calculation.

References 

COVID-19 pandemic in Germany
German medical research